Newtown-in-St Martin is a hamlet in the parish of St Martin-in-Meneage, Cornwall, England. Newtown is south-southeast of St Martin's Green.

References

Hamlets in Cornwall